José Luis Clerc was the defending champion but did not compete that year.

Ivan Lendl won in the final 6–2, 6–2 against Guillermo Vilas.

Seeds
A champion seed is indicated in bold text while text in italics indicates the round in which that seed was eliminated.

  Ivan Lendl (champion)
  Guillermo Vilas (final)
  Víctor Pecci (first round)
  Hans Gildemeister (second round)
  Rolf Gehring (quarterfinals)
  Jose Luis Damiani (second round)
  José Higueras (second round)
  Andrés Gómez (quarterfinals)

Draw

External links
 1981 South American Championships Singles draw

Singles